Viktor Ustinov (born 20 July 1974) is a retired Uzbekistani hammer thrower.

He won the bronze medal at the 2002 Asian Championships, finished fourth at the 2002 Asian Games, finished fifth at the 2003 Asian Championships and competed at the 2000 Olympic Games without reaching the final.

His personal best throw was 75.86 metres, achieved in September 2004 in Tashkent.

References

1974 births
Living people
Uzbekistani male hammer throwers
Athletes (track and field) at the 2000 Summer Olympics
Olympic athletes of Uzbekistan
Athletes (track and field) at the 2002 Asian Games
Asian Games competitors for Uzbekistan